Goodenia humilis, commonly known as swamp goodenia, is a species of flowering plant in the family Goodeniaceae and is endemic to south-eastern Australia. It is a weak, perennial herb with linear to lance-shaped leaves mostly at the base of the plant, and racemes or thyrses of yellow or yellowish-brown flowers.

Description

Taxonomy and naming
Goodenia humilis was first formally described in 1810 by Robert Brown in his Prodromus Florae Novae Hollandiae et Insulae Van Diemen. The specific epithet (humilis) means "low or small".

Distribution and habitat
This goodenia grows in swampy places and damp areas in woodland and grassland. It is widespread and locally common in Victoria but also occurs in Tasmania, the far south-east of South Australia and in New South Wales, south from Wapengo Lake.

References

humilis
Flora of South Australia
Flora of New South Wales
Flora of Tasmania
Flora of Victoria (Australia)
Plants described in 1810
Taxa named by Robert Brown (botanist, born 1773)
Endemic flora of Australia